TGB can stand for:
 Taiwan Golden Bee, manufacturer of scooters and quad bikes
 Taseko Mines Ltd, NYSE MKT symbol
 Temagami Greenstone Belt, a geologic formation in Temagami, Ontario, Canada
The Good Burger, restaurant chain in Spain
 Très grande bibliothèque, nickname of the Bibliothèque nationale de France
 Turkey Youth Union